Obiora Christian Onyedika, better known as Fanzy or Fanzy Papaya or The Duke Of Highlife, is a Nigerian singer and songwriter who hails from Anambra State. He is best known for singing with Nigerian indigenous language of Igbo and considered a pro when it comes to street "lamba".

He has successfully collaborated with top Nigerian musicians like, Flavour, Yemi Alade, Pato Ranking and many more.

Early life 
Fanzy Papaya grew up in Onitsha into a family of music enthusiasts. Both parents were choristers in church. He had interest in football and music while in high school.

Music career 

After finishing high school Fanzy decided to venture into music fulltime. He would hang around producers in the city, learning instruments and song recording before eventually having his first official single in 2012 - Paulina - which he featured Flavour.

In 2015 after signing for Fathafigga Entertainment, he released debut album Gold & Silver, which hosted songs like, Toyin Tomatoe, Pumpu, Kpuda, Obrigado etc.

After record deal ended with Fathafigga, he signed with Emvels Entertainment record label based in Lagos. Under Emvels, he released a couple of singles including  "Love Me" featuring Yemi Alade (2018) and Janet.

As an independent artist, following the expiration of second record deal, Fanzy has gone to release several notable songs including a remix of "Gold & Silver" with Nollywood star Ken Erics and "Goal - Goal" featuring highlife band Umu Obiligbo.

In October 2022, he released a 10 track EP, "Purpose"- which features singles like Goal Goal, Commado and tracks like, Canopy (With Ifex G and Bee Pee), kilamit Yoko, Executive Oga, etc.

Discography

Singles 

 Paulina (Feat Flavour) (2012).
 Toyin Tomatoe (2015).
 Bless Me (feat. Patoranking) 2016.
 Janet (2018)
 Igede (Feat. Reminisce) (2018)
 ParacetaMoney (2021)
 Goal - Goal (2021)
 Commando (2022)

Albums 

 Gold & Silver (2015)
 Purpose (2022)

Awards/Competitions 
 Best 15 Nigerian songs of October 2018 – Okay Africa.

Reference 

1992 births
Living people
Nigerian singer-songwriters
Musicians from Anambra State